Roseworthy Agricultural College was an agricultural college in Australia. It was the first agricultural college in Australia, established in 1883. It is now part of the University of Adelaide.

History

Establishment
Roseworthy College was the result of an initiative to develop a model farm. The idea was that the college would be an extension of the University of Adelaide and would be run by a Professor of Agriculture. The connection with the University was dropped and in 1882 John D. Custance took up the directorship and in 1883 the college's Main Building was completed. Custance may have been an effective manager but antagonized powerful politicians, and was sacked. In 1887, William Lowrie was appointed principal. Walter Richard Birks (1886–1960), principal from 1927 to 1932, was a distinguished college alumnus but was forced to resign after students' dissatisfaction culminated in strike action.

In 1936, a full-time Diploma of Oenology was offered. It was taught by Alan R. Hickinbotham and John L. Williams. Another early lecturer was John Fornachon, who did research in bacterial spoilage of fortified wines. Later, Bryce Rankine ran the course.

Research undertaken at the College included use of fertilisers in dryland cropping and a wheat breeding program, the released varieties all bearing the name of a bladed weapon. The graduates of the three faculties – Agriculture, Oenology and Natural Resources – were well regarded and winemaking students were drawn from throughout Australia and New Zealand.

Centenary
In 1983, the college's centenary publication explained: "The College encompasses approximately 1,200 hectares of land, most of which is used as a teaching and demonstration farm. There are about 500 hectares sown to wheat, barley, oats, oilseed and medic crops, with 10 hectares of orchard, vineyard and vegetable garden. The farm also carries sheep, Poll Shorthorn beef cattle, Jersey and Friesian dairy cattle, pigs, poultry, and representative range of both light and heavy horses, and some Angora goats ... Roseworthy also has a teaching winery (which includes a distillery) of 150 tonnes production capacity ... The College produces a range of table wines, sherries, ports and brandies."

Roseworthy Old Collegians Association
Roseworthy Old Collegians Association Incorporated (ROCA) is a University of Adelaide Alumni focused on the Roseworthy Campus. ROCA was created in 1898 and has provided an on-going bond for the many thousands of people who have been associated with the Campus since Roseworthy was established as Australia's first agricultural college in 1883. It boasts a membership of around 2000 life members and represents one of the bigger groups of the Adelaide University Alumni. ROCA's purpose has always been to promote the interests of the Roseworthy Campus. Its members are very proud of Roseworthy's history and the contribution of its people to society. ROCA acts as a guardian of the traditions of the Campus, and provides a link between Old Collegians and the Campus.

Merger
Roseworthy College remained a separate department of the South Australian government until 1973, when it became a College of Advanced Education under the Education Department, and officially co-educational. It had exclusively male students until 1972, and was primarily a residential college.

In 1991, the College merged with the University of Adelaide and became the University's Roseworthy Campus, part of the Faculty of Agricultural and Natural Resource Sciences. The merger would see teaching and research in oenology and viticulture transferred to the University's Waite Campus, along with the bulk of its work in plant breeding. (The proposal was controversial at the time, and the Student Union Council (RACSUC) held a wake at that time to emphasise the perceived future of the college/campus under the University of Adelaide.)

From the mid 1990s, the major focus of the campus turned to dryland agriculture, natural resource management and animal production. The campus is also now home to South Australia's first pre-service Veterinary Science training program, which commenced in purpose built facilities in 2010. In 2013, the focus on veterinary science was expanded with the opening of the Equine Health and Performance Centre, a state-of-the-art facility for equine surgery, sports medicine, internal medicine and reproduction.

Notable alumni
 Ray Beckwith (1912–2012), wine chemist with Penfolds
 Norman Brookman MLC (1901–1910)
 David Brookman, his son, MP for Alexandra (1948–1973)
 John Duval  – Penfolds Chief Winemaker 1986–2002, Owner and Winemaker John Duval Wines (Barossa Valley)
 Bruce Eastick - Former South Australian politician and Mayor of Gawler.
 Peter Gago – Penfolds Winemaker
 Dean Hewitson - owner and winemaker at Hewitson winery in the Barossa Valley.
 Brian Jefferies AM - Sheep breeding scientist and sheep extension officer.
 Rex Kuchel - forensic scientist and botanist
 David Lithgow Lewis OAM- Agricultural and humanitarian Worker 
 David Lowe – Owner and Winemaker Lowe Wines (Mudgee), President NSW Wine Industry Association, Vice President Australian Winemakers Federation
 Neil McGuigan - CEO, Australian Vintage Ltd
 Bill Moularadellis – Owner, Managing Director & Winemaker Kingston Estate, Non Executive Member of Wine Australia 
 Jeremy Oliver -Australian independent wine writer
Philip Shaw – Owner & Winemaker HOOSEGG Wines, previously owner & winemaker at Philip Shaw Wines (Orange), previously Chief Winemaker Rosemount and Southcorp Ltd (2001–03).  Winemaker of the Year at the London International Wine and Spirit Competition, in 1986 and 2000.  1999 Qantas Gourmet Traveller Wine Magazine's Australian Winemaker of the Year and was awarded the 2000 Graham Gregory Trophy for his outstanding contribution to the Australian wine industry.

References

University of Adelaide
Colleges of Advanced Education
Agricultural universities and colleges in Australia